Chewning House may refer to:

Chewning House (Lawrence, Kansas), listed on the National Register of Historic Places (NRHP)
Chewning House (Donansburg, Kentucky), NRHP-listed in Green County
Chewning House (Hendersonville, North Carolina), NRHP-listed in Henderson County